Dave Georgeff (born February 28, 1968 in Naperville, Illinois) is an American musician. Born in Naperville, Illinois, and raised in nearby Downers Grove, Georgeff is a graduate of the Musicians Institute in Los Angeles, California.

Georgeff is a member of the Los Angeles indie rock combo, Sign of the Fox.  He previously played bass guitar with mid-1990s Interscope-signed California pop punk band, Wax.  Wax gained notoriety for their music videos, directed by Spike Jonze, which received considerable play on MTV in the mid-1990s.

Georgeff works in the music industry in a consulting capacity.  He served as a music consultant on the film Jackass Number Two.

Georgeff long-ago adopted the alter-ego "Burdie Cutlass," and veterans of the California punk scene still call him that to this day.

References 

1968 births
Living people
People from Downers Grove, Illinois
Musicians Institute alumni
Wax (American band) members
20th-century American bass guitarists